John Hunter Wickersham (February 3, 1890 – September 12, 1918) was a United States Army officer and a recipient of the United States military's highest decoration—the Medal of Honor—for his actions in World War I.

Biography
Wickersham was born in Brooklyn, New York on February 3, 1890, to Mary E. Damon.  He moved to Denver, Colorado when a small boy and received his education in Denver.  In May 1917, a month after the American entry into World War I, he graduated from the First Officers Training Camp at Camp Funston on Fort Riley, Kansas. He was commissioned a Second Lieutenant and assigned to Company H, 353rd Infantry, 89th Division.  By September 11, 1918, he was serving in France.  On that day, as his unit prepared to take part in an offensive which would become the Battle of Saint-Mihiel, Wickersham wrote one last letter home to his mother in Denver. The letter contained a poem, "The Raindrops on Your Old Tin Hat", which was later published.

The next day, on September 12, Wickersham was severely wounded near Limey, France, but continued to lead his platoon in its advance until collapsing and succumbing to his injuries. For these actions, he was posthumously awarded the Medal of Honor in 1919.

Medal of Honor Citation
Rank and organization: Second Lieutenant, U.S. Army, Company H, 353rd Infantry, 89th Division. Place and date: At Limey, France; September 12, 1918. Entered service at: Denver Colorado.  Birth: February 3, 1890; New York, New York. General Orders: War Department, General Orders No. 16 ( January 22, 1919).

Citation:

Advancing with his platoon during the St. Mihiel offensive, Second Lieutenant Wickersham was severely wounded in four places by the bursting of a high-explosive shell. Before receiving any aid for himself he dressed the wounds of his orderly, who was wounded at the same time. He then ordered and accompanied the further advance of his platoon, although weakened by the loss of blood. His right hand and arm being disabled by wounds, he continued to fire his revolver with his left hand until, exhausted by loss of blood, he fell and died from his wounds before aid could be administered.

Military Awards 
Wickersham's military decorations and awards include:

Wickersham, aged 28 at his death, was buried at the St. Mihiel American Cemetery in Thiaucourt, France.
</ref> A marker in his memory was placed at Fairmount Cemetery in Denver, Colorado.

The poem he wrote to his mother the day before he died reads as follows:

See also

List of Medal of Honor recipients

References

1890 births
1918 deaths
American military personnel killed in World War I
United States Army Medal of Honor recipients
People from Denver
United States Army officers
World War I recipients of the Medal of Honor
Military personnel from New York City
Burials in Grand Est
Recipients of the War Merit Cross (Italy)